Qwerty Films is a British film production company set up by film producer Michael Kuhn in 1999; the name likely comes from the letters that start off most computer keyboards, "Q-W-E-R-T-Y".

Productions
 Golda (2022)
 Florence Foster Jenkins (2016)
 Suite française (2014)
 The Last Days on Mars (2013)
 Carrying the Light (2011) (TV)
 The Duchess (2008)
 Severance (2006)
 Alien Autopsy (2006)
 The Amateurs (2005)
 I Heart Huckabees (2004)
 Kinsey (2004 )
 Stage Beauty'' (2004)

References

Film production companies of the United Kingdom
1999 establishments in the United Kingdom